Michel Charlier (born 22 April 1949) is a French former professional racing cyclist. He rode in the 1976 Tour de France.

References

External links
 

1949 births
Living people
French male cyclists
Sportspeople from Oise
Cyclists from Hauts-de-France